This is a list of air bases operated by the People's Liberation Army Air Force (PLAAF). Facilities included in the list include all aerodromes at which the PLAAF maintains a regular presence. These may include those exclusively for military use as well as those portions of mixed-use aerodromes operated by the military. It may also include facilities in other countries at which the PLAAF controls a portion of facilities for regular operations.

Each listed air base includes the following elements of information as known.

 Primary air base name. The official or most commonly used name for the military portion of the aerodrome
 Chinese name. Simplified (mainland) Chinese characters for the primary name (not including characters for air base or air field)
 Alternate names. Other names used to describe the military portion or larger aerodrome including civilian name
 IATA Code. IATA location identifier issued by the International Air Transport Association
 ICAO Code. ICAO airport codes issued by the International Civil Aviation Organization. Typically air bases used strictly by military forces and closed to civil aviation are given an identifier in the form of "CN-XXXX".
 Use. Military, civilian, or dual-use (current)
 Subordination. The higher command to which the air base is assigned; this is often a theater command air force
 Coordinates. The coordinates for the aerodrome; linked to the geo-hack, adjusted as necessary to avoid the Wu-shift
 Runways. Direction and length (in meters) of operational runways
 Tenants. Units known or suspected to maintain a presence on the air base and their aircraft

Current air bases 

Airbases
 
China bases
China